The Chilean roughy (Hoplostethus fragilis) is a slimehead native to the Valparaíso region of Chile in the southeast Pacific. It has been known to contain high levels of mercury.

References

External links
 

Chilean roughy
Endemic fauna of Chile
Fish of Chile
Western South American coastal fauna
Chilean roughy